Cygnus OB2 is an OB association that is home to some of the most massive and most luminous stars known, including suspected Luminous blue variable Cyg OB2 #12. It also includes one of the largest known stars, NML Cygni. The region is embedded within a wider one of star formation known as Cygnus X, which is one of the most luminous objects in the sky at radio wavelengths. The region is approximately 1,570 parsecs from Earth in the constellation of Cygnus.

The young cluster is one of the largest known and the largest in the northern hemisphere with some authors formerly classifying it as a young globular cluster similar to those in the Large Magellanic Cloud. Today, however, it is considered a massive, low-density stellar association.

Although it is over ten times more massive than the Orion Nebula, which is easily seen with the naked eye, Cygnus OB2 is hidden behind a massive dust cloud known as the Cygnus Rift, which obscures many of the stars in it. This means that despite its large size, it is hard to determine its actual properties. The estimated number of massive stars range from 50 to 100 of spectral type O and its total mass having been calculated as (4–10) or 3 solar masses according to other investigations.

Despite this, recent surveys ranging from radio to X-ray wavelengths have observed the region to great depths to gain a better understanding of how the processes of star and planet formation occur on such a large scale. These studies include observations with the Chandra X-ray Observatory, Spitzer Space Telescope, the Herschel Space Observatory and the Gran Telescopio Canarias. As for recent observations, the final stages of the process of photoablation is taking place, where the biggest stars formed and cleared the ambient material from the region.

The progenitor of BD+43°3654 might have been a member of Cygnus OB2. Two stars from two binaries would have collided and merged forming BD+43°3654, which would have then been ejected from the stellar association along with the two remaining stars.

Prominent members of the association are often referred to by their Schulte numbers: for example Schulte 12, VI Cygni 12, or Cygnus OB2 #12. The numbers were first used in the 1953 discovery paper where 11 "blue giants" were numbered. A 12th star (Cyg OB2 #12) was added in 1954, and eight more shortly after. Schulte himself maintained the already-published numbers and added many more when studying the association which he called VI Cygni.

References 

Stellar associations
Articles containing video clips
Cygnus (constellation)
Star-forming regions